Dylan McFarland (born July 11, 1980, Kalispell, Montana) is a former American football offensive lineman for the Buffalo Bills in the National Football League and the Hamburg Sea Devils in NFL Europa.

After playing college football at the University of Montana, where he was two-time All-American, McFarland was drafted in the seventh round of the 2004 NFL Draft by the Buffalo Bills. He spent most of his time with the Bills bouncing back and forth from the practice squad, and played maybe 18 NFL snaps in his career.

References

1980 births
Living people
People from Kalispell, Montana
American football offensive linemen
Players of American football from Montana
University of Montana alumni
Montana Grizzlies football players
Buffalo Bills players
Hamburg Sea Devils players